Paulus Hochgatterer (born 16 July 1961) is an Austrian writer and psychiatrist. He is the author of several novels and story collections. One of his novels called Die Süsse des Lebens won the EU Prize for Literature. It was translated into English as The Sweetness of Life by Jamie Bulloch.

References

1961 births
Living people
20th-century Austrian novelists
21st-century Austrian novelists
Austrian male novelists
Austrian medical writers
20th-century Austrian male writers
21st-century male writers